Alapalooza: The Videos is a VHS release of four of "Weird Al" Yankovic's music videos.

The VHS includes:
"Jurassic Park" (Alapalooza)
"Bedrock Anthem" (Alapalooza)
"UHF" (UHF)
"You Don't Love Me Anymore" (Off the Deep End)

External links 
 

"Weird Al" Yankovic video albums
1993 video albums
Music video compilation albums
1993 compilation albums
Scotti Brothers Records albums
Scotti Brothers Records compilation albums
1990s English-language films